The Rough Guide to Cajun & Zydeco is a compilation album originally released in 1998. Part of the World Music Network Rough Guides series, the album features the cajun and zydeco genres of Louisiana in roughly equal measures. Phil Stanton, co-founder of the World Music Network, compiled and produced the album. This was the first of two similarly named compilations: the second edition was released in 2011.

Critical reception

The album received generally positive reviews. Writing for AllMusic, Adam Greenberg lamented the exclusion of Boozoo Chavis and Beau Jocque, but still called it "enjoyable in the right ways". Michaelangelo Matos of the Chicago Reader claimed the release almost "converted" him to the genres, comparing it with Disc 3 of Harry Smith's Anthology of American Folk Music.

Track listing

References

External links 
 

1998 compilation albums
World Music Network Rough Guide albums